Montagu John Stone-Wigg (1861–1918) was an Anglican Colonial Bishop.

Early life 
He was born on 4 October 1861, the son of John Stone Wigg and  his wife Ellen Matilda (née Clements).  He was educated at Winchester and University College, Oxford.

Religious life 
Ordained in 1885, after curacies in Westminster  Hammersmith he went to Brisbane in 1889 to be the Sub dean of St John's cathedral. Two years later he became a Canon and in 1898 he became the inaugural Bishop of New Guinea.

He received the degree Doctor of Divinity (DD) honoris causa from the University of Oxford in October 1902. He retired as Bishop of New Guinea in 1908. In 1912 he founded, and was the first editor of, the national Anglican newspaper, the Church Standard.

Later life 
He died on 16 October 1918.

References

1861 births
People educated at Winchester College
Alumni of University College, Oxford
19th-century Anglican bishops in Oceania
20th-century Anglican bishops in Oceania
Anglican bishops of New Guinea
1918 deaths